The 2022–23 season is the 134th season in the existence of Bolton Wanderers Football Club, the club's second consecutive season in EFL League One and the first time in five seasons that they have started consecutive seasons in the same division. It will cover the period from 1 July 2022 to 30 June 2023. In addition to the league, they will also compete in the 2022–23 FA Cup, the 2022–23 EFL Cup and the 2022–23 EFL Trophy.

Squad

First team

Bolton B

Out on loan

Pre-season and friendlies
On 11 May 2022, the club announced that they would be travelling to Portugal for a training camp once the squad reported for pre season training on 17 June. Five days later, Bolton announced their opening batch of pre-season fixtures with trips to Longridge Town, Chorley, Oldham Athletic and Southport. A further fixture away to Carlisle United was confirmed on 20 May. On 23 May, the game at Oldham Athletic was cancelled after the reaction of some supporters to the fixture. The same day, two more fixtures against Atherton Collieries and Bamber Bridge were announced. On 8 June, Bolton announced their first home fixture of pre-season, against Championship side Huddersfield Town to be played on 23 July, a week before the start of the season. Another friendly against Stockport County was confirmed the same day, to be played on 5 July behind closed doors due to both teams pitches being re-laid. On 24 June, the final fixture of pre-season was announced against Championship side Watford to be played on 12 July behind closed doors at Watford Training Ground. It also served as a replacement fixture for the cancelled Oldham Athletic friendly. On 9 July, Bolton played an unannounced friendly against their near neighbours Wigan Athletic.

Competitions

Overall record

League One

League table

Results summary

Results by matchday

Matches

The fixtures for the 2022–23 EFL League One season were released on 23 June and sees Bolton opening their campaign away at Ipswich Town on 30 July. The regular season will conclude on 7 May away at Bristol Rovers.

FA Cup

Bolton were drawn at home to Barnsley in the first round. For the match, Bolton wore a remade version of the shirt they wore 100 years prior to celebrate the centenary anniversary of them winning the 1923 FA Cup Final.

EFL Cup

Bolton entered the EFL Cup at the first round stage, along with all other League One and League Two club and the majority of Championship clubs. The draw was made on 23 June and saw Bolton drawn at home to Salford City. In the next round, Bolton were handed another home tie against Aston Villa.

EFL Trophy

On 20 June, the initial Group stage draw was made, grouping Bolton Wanderers with Crewe Alexandra and Tranmere Rovers. On 23 June, Leeds United U21 joined them. Bolton were then drawn at home to Barrow in the second round, Manchester United U21 in the third round and to Portsmouth in the quarter-finals. The Whites were drawn away to Accrington Stanley in the semi-finals.

Statistics

|-
! colspan="14" style="background:#dcdcdc; text-align:center"| Goalkeepers

|-
! colspan="14" style="background:#dcdcdc; text-align:center"| Defenders

|-
! colspan="14" style="background:#dcdcdc; text-align:center"| Midfielders

|-
! colspan="14" style="background:#dcdcdc; text-align:center"| Forwards

|-
! colspan="14" style="background:#dcdcdc; text-align:center"| Player(s) who left the club

|- 
! colspan="14" style="background:#dcdcdc; text-align:center"| Player(s) out on loan

|}

Goals record

Disciplinary record

Transfers

In

Out

Loans in

Loans out

References 

Bolton Wanderers F.C. seasons
Bolton Wanderers
English football clubs 2022–23 season